Moraea miniata is a plant species in the family Iridaceae.

References

miniata
Taxa named by Henry Cranke Andrews